Archie William Noel Porter (December 18, 1885 – March 14, 1963) was the third bishop of the Diocese of Northern California in The Episcopal Church from 1933 to 1957,
having previously served as archdeacon and bishop coadjutor.

References

1885 births
1963 deaths
20th-century American Episcopalians
Episcopal bishops of Northern California